As of 3 April 2018, Rupauliya  is now a ward (Ward No 1) within Susta Rural Municipality. Before that, it was a village development committee in Nawalparasi District in the Lumbini Zone of southern Nepal. At the time of the 1991 Nepal census, it had a population of 6,331 people living in 1,128 individual households.

References

Populated places in Parasi District